The Transport Legislation Review is a policy and legislation review project conducted by the Department of Transport in the State of Victoria, Australia between 2004 and late 2010. The aim of the project was review of transport policy and laws and generation of new policy and legislation as a platform for better transport across the State.

The Review was the most extensive project of its kind in transport in Victoria and touched all areas of transport including land and water based transport activities.  Proposals were developed by the Review for consideration by the Victorian Government and proceeded initially as policy ideas. Proposals were progressively refined over time using modules and sub projects sometimes in response to stakeholder input.  Outputs from Review often proceeded as new State regulatory schemes and laws, commonly in the form of Bills considered by the Victorian Parliament.

The new laws which arose from the Review had regulatory and de-regulatory effects in particular areas.  The Review was notable for pursuing principle-based initiatives, introducing performance-based concepts into transport law often in the form of safety duties owed by industry participants to persons using transport services and to other industry participants and suites of new administrative and court sanctions targeted at non compliance. The project also had significant impacts on organisational arrangements in Victorian transport.

The Victorian Government Ministers who oversaw the work of the project at times were Peter Batchelor, Lynne Kosky, Tim Pallas and Martin Pakula.

Scope 
The work of the Transport Legislation Review was described in a 2009 paper released by the Department of Transport:

A comprehensive review of Victoria’s transport policy and legislation has been underway since 2004.  Its aim has been to modernise transport policy, legislation and regulatory practices, drawing on developments in regulatory theory and approaches in other industry sectors and in other jurisdictions.

The explanatory memorandum to the Transport Legislation Amendment (Compliance, Enforcement and Regulation) Bill 2010 also observed that:

"...major renewal is underway across the transport portfolios through the Government's Transport Legislation Review.  This project is ...generating an entire new legislative framework for the State along best practice lines."

Context 
The Transport Legislation Review arose from concerns about the poor state of Victoria's transport laws. In particular, most transport legislation was thought to be complex, unnecessarily detailed and generally based on old policy. The Victorian Government was also troubled that areas of the laws did not reflect regulatory advances in other industries and were not sufficiently informed by overseas reforms.

Pearce and Shepherd observed that it "...was a timely point to commence the review, given it had been 20 years since the State's central transport statute, the Transport Act 1983, was first enacted....   They went on to say that the -

"...Transport Act had become the largest statute in Victoria with over 700 pages of dense and prescriptive provisions in accordance with the prevailing legislative style.  A number of other transport related Acts (and amendments to the Transport Act) had also been created to respond to different transport policies of successive governments over time.  Most of these were examples of either facilitative or coercive legislative approaches.  Importantly, however, there was no overarching framework for transport policy reflected in the State's legislation.   In other words, transport legislation did not have aspirational elements.  More specifically:

  there was no clear vision for the transport system
 bodies (such as VicRoads and the Director of Public Transport) were established with different (and potentially competing) objectives
 there was no overarching framework to express broader policy objectives for transport as a whole
 the legislation contained minimal reference to social policy objectives and no reference to environmental objectives
 linkages with related areas (such as planning and local government) were not clear or not recognised."

Plan and approach 
The Review aimed to complete a wholesale revision of the State's transport policies and legislation.  The project was guided by a target legislative framework diagram showing the final desired state of transport legislation in Victoria after completion of work. The diagram was headed by an overarching portfolio-based statute intended to provide long term symbolic and aspirational direction, the Transport Integration Act, supported by a range of transport modal and subject-specific statutes. Diagrams showing the current and former legislative structures were also used.

The Review was policy-driven and proceeded on a modular basis.   This approach "...sought to more clearly delineate between overarching institutional elements and more detailed regulatory, operational, project and service delivery elements.  It also sought to explicitly identify linkages within the transport portfolio (road, rail, tram, bus, taxi, hire car, tow trucks) and interfaces with other portolios (local government authorities and planning portfolios)."

The majority of the new statutes which emerged from the work of the Review were preceded by extensive policy and stakeholder processes.  This typically involved the public release of documents outlining issues in the relevant transport sector and later circulation of draft proposals which signalled the intended direction of change.   The conduct of industry and public consultation forums and the receipt of public submissions was a feature of this activity.

New laws generated 
The Review concentrated on long, medium and short term measures. Global sector or scheme reviews typically resulted in the creation of suites of new contemporary regulatory policy which led in most instances to new Acts of Parliament which repealed existing Acts. These are called principal statutes and typically take two years or more to fully complete. Smaller or mid range reforms, on the other hand, were pursued through Acts which amended existing principal statutes.

Principal statutes 

The work of the Transport Legislation Review led to the development and enactment of seven major principal statutes between early 2006 and late 2010. The centrepiece of the Review and now the prime transport statute in Victoria is the  Transport Integration Act 2010 which came into effect on 1 July 2010.  The Act "....locates the development of a policy framework for integrated and sustainable transport in Victoria within global and international debates regarding sustainable development.  This has resulted in the inclusion of a vision, set of objectives and decision making principles for transport in the (transport Integration Act) reflecting an integration and sustainability policy framework."

In addition to the Transport Integration Act, the six principal statutes generated by the Review were:

Other statutes 
A wide range of amending statutes was also generated. While generally smaller than most principal statutes, the amending Acts often dealt with significant "big picture" changes and were routinely used to pursue discrete, urgent and priority regulatory reforms.

Some of these statutes developed by the Review included:

Regulations 
A range of new regulations was also generated by the Review. In the majority of cases, the regulations were advertised publicly in draft form accompanied by regulatory impact statements, and made available for comment by individuals, the community and affected industries.

Principal regulations 
Examples of new principal regulations developed by the Review included:

Other regulations 
Examples of other regulations developed by the Review included:

Organisational impacts 
The work of the Transport Legislation Review had significant impacts on governance arrangements in the Victorian Transport portfolio.  These effects can be summarised as follows:

Legislative structure impacts 
The Review had major impacts on Victoria's transport legislation suite.  Before the Review, Victoria's suite of legislation was divided into land-based and water-based groupings.  The land-based group covering rail and road statutes and associated activities was headed by the Transport Act 1983.  By contrast, the water-based grouping regulating the ports and marine sectors had no central coordinating statute.   Both groupings were characterised by old and inconsistent underlying policy frameworks.

The Transport Integration Act was developed by the Review to provide a central statute to facilitate integration and co-ordination of the whole transport portfolio through the introduction of a modern policy framework and re-establishment of agencies with consistent charters which were tied bound by the framework.   The development of the Transport Integration Act also ultimately led to the subordination and renaming of the Transport Act as the Transport (Compliance and Miscellaneous) Act 1983.

Further complex and discrete structural changes were driven by the Review through policy reviews and the development of new individual statutory schemes.   For example, the work of the Review led to Victoria's first ever stand alone statutory schemes for rail and bus safety (the Rail Safety Act and Bus Safety Act), vehicle towing regulation (the Accident Towing Services Act), reduction of red tape in respect of approval and delivery of major transport projects (the Major Transport Projects Facilitation Act), tourist railways regulation (the Tourist and Heritage Railways Act) and public transport ticketing requirements (the Transport (Ticketing) Regulations).

Incomplete or pending reviews 
The work of the Transport Legislation Review concluded in late 2010.  Major areas signalled for overhaul before the conclusion of the project included policy reviews and new statutes in the following areas:
 Taxi and Hire Car regulation
 Walking and Cycling
 Road Safety
 Port Management
 compliance, enforcement and other matters covered by the Transport (Compliance and Miscellaneous) Act 1983.

Taxi industry reform was taken up as a major issue by the Victorian Government when the Review concluded.  The Government established a Taxi Industry Inquiry in May 2011 under a new agency, the Taxi Services Commission.   The Inquiry ultimately recommended major changes to policy and legislation to reform the taxi and small commercial passenger vehicles sector.  The recommendations are currently being implemented.

Support and criticism 
The Transport Legislation Review project and its policy and legislation projects were well supported during the term of the project.  Most Acts and regulations generated by the project were passed or made with broad support and little or no opposition from affected parties.  In the six years of the project, no Act or regulation failed to be passed by the Victorian Parliament even when the Government of the day did not control Parliamentary numbers.  The overwhelming majority of Act products, for example, were passed by Parliament with all party support.

While the Review was not subject to public criticism, some individual policy and legislative proposals arising from it were criticised. For example, the Rail Safety Act 2006 was opposed on a reasoned basis in the Victorian Parliament by Liberal and National party members of Parliament.  However, the Bill was ultimately passed. Several policy proposals developed  by the project including in 2009 during a review of the Marine Act 1988 were abandoned and not included in the subsequent Marine Safety Act 2010 due to widespread opposition.

The Bill for the Transport Integration Act was criticised by Liberal and National party members during its passage through Parliament but was not opposed.  Finally, a proposal to add port authorities to the Transport Integration Act organisational framework was opposed and eventually defeated in the Legislative Council by the Liberal, National and Green parties. However, the Bill was later passed by the Victorian Parliament due to use of a dispute resolution process.

See also

References

External links 
 Department of Transport Information about the Transport Legislation Review
 Department of Transport Information about the Transport Integration Act

Transport in Victoria (Australia)
Victoria (Australia) legislation
Transport law in Australia